Natalia Gastiain Tena (born 1 November 1984) is a British actress and musician. She is known for playing Nymphadora Tonks in the Harry Potter film series (2007-2011), and the wildling Osha in the HBO series Game of Thrones (2011-2013; 2016). 

Tena is the lead singer and accordionist of Molotov Jukebox. The band released their debut album Carnival Flower (2014), in Spring 2014, featuring their single "Neon Lights". Their second studio album, Tropical Gypsy (2016), was released on 15 April 2016 and was preceded by its lead single, "Pineapple Girl". It was promoted on the band's Tropical Gypsy Tour in April and May 2016.

Early life
Natalia Gastiain Tena was born in London, the daughter of Spanish parents, María Tena, a secretary, and Jesús Andrew Gastiain, a carpenter. Her family is of Extremaduran and Basque origin, and she was raised in the United Kingdom. Tena is fluent in English and Spanish.  She studied at the boarding school Bedales.

Tena was taught the piano by her mother at five years old, influenced by Chuck Berry's music. Afterwards, at 18, Tena moved back to London and busked on the London Underground. While working with a theatre group called KneeHigh, where they were allowed to pick an instrument to play, Tena decided to learn the accordion.

Career

Tena made her professional debut as Ellie in About a Boy (2002), and began acting full-time in 2003. She has played lead roles in stage adaptations of Gone to Earth in 2004, and Nights at the Circus in 2006.

In 2007, Tena appeared in the film adaptation of Harry Potter and the Order of the Phoenix playing the character Nymphadora Tonks. Tena reprised this role in its sequels Harry Potter and the Half-Blood Prince, in 2009, Harry Potter and the Deathly Hallows – Part 1 in 2010 and Part 2 in 2011.

She hosted a behind-the-scenes featurette entitled "Trailing Tonks" for the subsequent DVD and Blu-ray release, and is credited as producer and director of the featurette, in which she also performs an original Christmas-themed blues song on guitar, which she composed while working as a busker on the London Underground.

In 2011, she played a lead role in the Scottish Film You Instead. She also appeared as Osha in HBO's Game of Thrones. In March 2013, she starred in the official music video for Lapalux's single "Without You (ft. Kerry Leatham)".

In 2014, Tena co-starred as a mentally ill woman in the Black Mirror Christmas episode "White Christmas".

In 2015, she starred as the lead, Jennifer Preston, in the British mini-series Residue. In 2017, Tena was cast as Sara Morten in the CBS drama Wisdom of the Crowd.

In April 2018, it was announced that Tena was cast in the series regular role of Lana Pierce on the YouTube science fiction series Origin.

Personal life
Tena is close friends with fellow Game of Thrones actress Oona Chaplin.

Filmography

Film

Television

Stage

References

External links

1984 births
21st-century accordionists
21st-century English actresses
Actresses from London
English accordionists
English film actresses
English Shakespearean actresses
British people of Basque descent
British people of Spanish descent
English stage actresses
English television actresses
Living people
People educated at Bedales School
Place of birth missing (living people)
Royal Shakespeare Company members